Claudette is a feminine form of the masculine given name Claude.

Claudette may refer to:

People
 Claudette Boyer (born 1938), Canadian politician
 Claudette Bradshaw (1949–2022), Canadian politician
 Claudette Bryanston, English theatre director
 Claudette Colbert (1903–1996), American actress
 Claudette Colvin (born 1939), American civil rights pioneer
 Claudette Hauiti (born 1961), New Zealand politician
 Claudette Johnson (born 1959), British visual artist
 Claudette Joseph, Grenadian politician
 Claudette Maillé (born 1964), Mexican actress
 Claudette Mink (born 1971), Canadian actress
 Claudette Ortiz (born 1981), American singer
 Claudette Pace (born 1968), Maltese politician
 Claudette Rogers Robinson (born 1942), American singer
 Claudette Schreuders (born 1973), South African sculptor and painter
 Claudette Tardif (born 1947), Canadian politician
 Claudette Werleigh (born 1946), Haiti's first female prime minister (1995–1996)
 Claudette Woodard (1945–2010), American politician

Fictional characters
 Claudette Beaulieu, from the American soap opera General Hospital
 Claudette Hubbard, from the British soap opera EastEnders
 Claudette St. Croix, one of the superhero M-Twins
 Claudette Wyms, from the American television series The Shield
 Claudette, from the 1980 film Friday the 13th
 Claudette, from the 2003 film The Room
 Claudette Morel, from Dead by Daylight